Flory Van Donck (23 June 1912 – 14 January 1992) was a Belgian professional golfer.

Van Donck is widely regarded as the greatest ever Belgian golfer. During his career, he won more than fifty tournaments worldwide, including many of the most prestigious national opens of Europe. He also finished as runner up in The Open Championship on two occasions.

Career
Van Donck was born in Tervuren, Flemish Brabant. Until the likes of Seve Ballesteros and Bernhard Langer burst onto the golf scene in the late 1970s, Van Donck was one of the few golfers from continental Europe who had been able to win regularly in professional tournaments in Britain. Much of Van Donck's fame rested on his great putting ability, though his style was unorthodox as he kept the toe of his putter in the air, similar to Isao Aoki.

Van Donck held most of the national open titles in Europe at one time or another, including the Belgian Open and Dutch Open (five times each), Italian Open (four times), French Open (three times), German Open and Swiss Open (twice each), and Portuguese Open (once). In 1953 he won a total of seven tournaments on the European circuit, a record he still shares with Norman Von Nida who achieved the feat in 1947, and was awarded the Harry Vardon Trophy.

In addition to his victories around Europe, Van Donck dominated in his home country, winning the Belgian national title sixteen times between 1935 and 1968 and the Professional Tournament of the Alliance on ten occasions. In 1960 he was awarded the Trophée National du Mérite Sportif, the highest honour that is awarded to Belgian sportsmen in recognition of his achievements.

Van Donck was runner up in The Open Championship twice. In 1956 at Hoylake, he finished three strokes behind Peter Thomson, and in 1959 at Muirfield he finished alongside Fred Bullock two strokes adrift of Gary Player. Such was his consistency, he did not finish outside the top five for five years succession from 1955, and finished inside the top 10 eight years out of ten during the 1950s.

He represented Belgium in the Canada Cup, latterly the World Cup, on 19 occasions. His last appearance was in 1979 as a 67-year-old, when he became the oldest player ever to participate in the World Cup. In 1960, he was the lowest-scoring player (for the International Trophy) at Portmarnock in Ireland, from a field that included some of the sports all-time greats, such as Sam Snead, Arnold Palmer, Bobby Locke, Gary Player, Peter Thomson and Kel Nagle.

Tournament wins (60)
this list is incomplete
1936 Dutch Open
1937 Dutch Open
1938 Italian Open
1939 Belgian Open
1946 Belgian Open, Dutch Open
1947 Manchester Evening Chronicle Tournament, Belgian Open, Italian Open
1951 Dutch Open, Silver King Tournament, North British-Harrogate Tournament
1952 Southern Professional Championship
1953 Belgian Open, Dutch Open, German Open, Italian Open, Swiss Open, Silver King Tournament, Yorkshire Evening News Tournament
1954 French Open, Uruguayan International Golf Championship
1955 Italian Open, Portuguese Open, Swiss Open
1956 Belgian Open, German Open
1957 French Open, Venezuela Open (Feb)
1958 French Open
1960 Canada Cup (individual title), Omnium of Belgium
1962 Lancia d'Oro
1963 Omnium of Belgium
1964 Omnium of Belgium
1965 Omnium of Belgium
1966 Omnium of Belgium
1968 Omnium of Belgium
Belgian Professional Championship: 16 wins
Professional Tournament of the Alliance: 10 wins

Results in major championships

Note: Van Donck only played in the Masters Tournament and The Open Championship.

NT = No tournament
CUT = missed the half-way cut
"T" indicates a tie for a place

Team appearances
World Cup (representing Belgium): 1954, 1955, 1956, 1957, 1958, 1959, 1960 (individual winner), 1961, 1962, 1963, 1964, 1965, 1966, 1967, 1968, 1969, 1970, 1972, 1979
Joy Cup: (representing the Rest of Europe): 1954, 1955, 1956, 1958

References

External links
Mention of Flory Van Donck's year of death 

Belgian male golfers
European Tour golfers
Sportspeople from Flemish Brabant
People from Tervuren
1912 births
1992 deaths